Koszalin railway station is a railway station in Koszalin, Poland. As of 2012, it is served by Przewozy Regionalne (local and InterRegio services) and PKP Intercity (Ekspres and TLK services).

Train services

The station is served by the following services:

Express Intercity Premium services (EIP) Kołobrzeg - Gdynia - Warsaw - Kraków
 Intercity services (IC) Łódź Fabryczna — Warszawa — Gdańsk Glowny — Kołobrzeg
Intercity services (IC) Szczecin - Koszalin - Słupsk - Gdynia - Gdańsk
Intercity services (IC) Szczecin - Koszalin - Słupsk - Gdynia - Gdańsk - Elbląg/Iława - Olsztyn
Intercity services (IC) Szczecin - Koszalin - Słupsk - Gdynia - Gdańsk - Elbląg - Olsztyn - Białystok
Intercity services (IC) Ustka - Koszalin - Poznań - Wrocław - Opole - Bielsko-Biała
Intercity services (IC) Ustka - Koszalin - Poznań - Wrocław - Katowice - Kraków - Rzeszów - Przemyśl
Intercity services (IC) Słupsk - Koszalin - Poznań - Wrocław
Intercity services (IC) Słupsk - Koszalin - Poznań - Wrocław - Opole - Katowice
Intercity services (TLK) Kołobrzeg — Gdynia Główna — Warszawa Wschodnia — Kraków Główny
Regional services (R) Słupsk — Koszalin
Regional services (R) Słupsk — Koszalin — Kołobrzeg
Regional services (R) Słupsk — Koszalin — Szczecin Główny
Regional services (R) Koszalin — Kołobrzeg — Goleniów — Szczecin Główny
Regional services (R) Koszalin — Białogard — Stargard — Szczecin Główny
Regional services (R) Kołobrzeg — Koszalin
Regional services (R) Koszalin — Białogard
Regional services (R) Koszalin — Białogard — Szczecinek — Piła Główna — Poznań Główny
Regional services (R) Kołobrzeg — Koszalin — Białogard — Szczecinek — Piła Główna — Poznań Główny

References

Station article at kolej.one.pl

Railway stations in West Pomeranian Voivodeship
Railway stations served by Przewozy Regionalne InterRegio
Railway station